INDEPABIS (instituto de defensa) - Institute for Defense of People in the Access to Goods and Services) is Venezuela's consumer protection agency. It is under the control of the Ministry of Commerce.

Indepabis was created in August 2008 under the Ley para el Derecho de las Personas en el Acceso de Bienes y Servicios (Law for the Right of Access to Goods and Services), replacing the previous Instituto para la Defensa del Consumidor y el Usuario (Indecu).

INDEPABIS' President until February 2010 was then trade minister Eduardo Samán.

After arrest of current president Trino Martinéz, because of large sum of money and firearms found in his car, Eduardo Samán returned to position of INDEPABIS president.

References

External links
  
 ¿Por qué el Indecu ahora se llama Indepabis? 

Consumer rights agencies
Consumer organizations in Venezuela
Organizations established in 2008
2008 establishments in Venezuela